IRAS 18357–0604 is a yellow hypergiant (YHG) star located in the constellation of Scutum, estimated to be about 19,600 light years, or 6,000 parsecs, away. IRAS 18357–0604 is remarkably similar to IRC +10420, another yellow hypergiant in the constellation of Aquila.

Position 
A distance of 6,000 parsecs (inferred from the systemic velocity of the star) would place IRAS 18357–0604 within the red supergiant (RSG) "association" in the Scutum-Centaurus arm, which contains clusters such as RSGC1 and RSGC2. The luminosity derived from the distance is consistent with IRAS 18357–0604 being formed from the same star formation burst as that which created the red supergiants in the area. The star is also located about 14 arcminutes from RSGC2, so the possibility of it being a runaway from the cluster cannot be excluded, but replicating its properties in such a scenario would require an unexpectedly extreme mass-loss rate during its preceding red supergiant phase.

Properties 
IRAS 18357–0604 is likely to be a very luminous star, like all YHGs.

Evolutionary Status 
In the RSG agglomerate of which IRAS 18357–0604 may be a part, RSGC1 and RSGC2 represent the youngest and oldest clusters in the area. If this age and mass range is applicable to the wider RSG association, the parameters of IRAS 18357–0604 are consistent with membership of the association.

Notes

References 

Scutum (constellation)
A-type hypergiants
IRAS catalogue objects